Everything's Gonna Be Okay is an American comedy television series created by Australian comedian Josh Thomas. Thomas previously created, wrote, directed and starred in the semi-autobiographical award-winning series Please Like Me. Everything's Gonna Be Okay premiered on Freeform on January 16, 2020. In May 2020, the series was renewed for a second season which premiered on April 8, 2021. In August 2021, the series was canceled after two seasons.

Premise
Nicholas, an Australian in his twenties, visits his American father and two teenage half-sisters in Los Angeles. During his visit, he learns that their father is terminally ill and wants Nicholas to become the guardian to Genevieve and Matilda, because their mother is already dead.

Cast

Main
 Josh Thomas as Nicholas Moss: a neurotic, gay Australian entomologist in his twenties. At the end of season two he gets diagnosed with autism.
 Kayla Cromer as Matilda Moss: Nicholas's autistic half-sister who is 17-years old at the start of the series. She is a gifted classical composer. Cromer herself is autistic, which she felt helped her land the part despite self-submitting without an agent.
 Adam Faison as Alex: Nicholas' boyfriend throughout the first two seasons.
 Maeve Press as Genevieve Moss: Nicholas's half-sister who is an aspiring writer. She is 14 years old at the start of the series.

Recurring
Lillian Carrier as Drea, Matilda's autistic asexual girlfriend and later wife
Lori Mae Hernandez as Barb, Genevieve's friend
Vivienne Walsh as Penny, Nicholas's mother who occasionally video calls from Australia
Charlie Evans as Leonard, Genevieve's love interest
Vico Ortiz as Lindsey, Alex's friend
Carsen Warner as Jeremy, Matilda's classmate (season 1, guest season 2)
Kimleigh Smith as Mrs. Hall, Genevieve's teacher (season 1, guest season 2)
Ivy Wolk as Tellulah, Genevieve's friend (season 1)
Mason Gooding as Luke, Matilda's crush (season 1)
Timothy Isaac Brundidge as Zane, Matilda's classmate who she sleeps with at a party (season 1)
Hye Young Park as Sam, Matilda's teacher (season 1)
James M. Connor as Principal Young, Genevieve and Matilda's principal (season 1)
Maria Bamford as Suze, Drea's mother (season 2)
Richard Kind as Tobias, Drea's father (season 2)
Christian Valderrama as Oscar, Genevieve's love interest (season 2)
CJ Jones as Eric, Alex's deaf father (season 2)

Episodes

Season 1 (2020)

Season 2 (2021)

Production

Development 
On May 10, 2018, it was announced that Freeform had given a pilot order to Everything’s Gonna Be Okay, written by Australian comedian Josh Thomas. On December 12, 2018, it was announced that the pilot was picked up to series by Freeform with a 10-episode series order. It was also announced that Thomas would be serving as showrunner with David Martin, Jon Thoday, and Richard Allen-Turner executive producing on behalf of Avalon Television. Stephanie Swedlove and Kevin Whyte would serve as executive producers. On May 19, 2020, Freeform renewed the series for a second season which premiered on April 8, 2021, and ran for 10 episodes until June 3, 2021. On August 17, 2021, Freeform canceled the series after two seasons.

Casting 
After Thomas' announcement to be starring in the series as Nicholas, autistic actress Kayla Cromer was revealed to be portraying Matilda in November 2019. Cromer herself is autistic, which she felt helped her land the part despite self-submitting without an agent. That same month, Maeve Press was cast as Genevieve, Nicholas' 15-year-old half-sister. In January 2020, days before the series premiered, Adam Faison was cast as Alex, Nicholas' boyfriend.

Release
New episodes are available the day after they air on Hulu and Freeform On Demand. The series will be distributed internationally by Avalon Distribution. In Australia it is set to be released on streaming service Stan, the same day as the U.S.

Reception

Critical response
On Rotten Tomatoes, the series has an approval rating of 94% based on 17 reviews. The website's critical consensus reads, "Sweetly poignant and warmly witty Everything's Gonna Be Okay is as big-hearted and nuanced as the well-written characters at its center." On Metacritic, it has a weighted average score of 80 out of 100, based on 6 critics, indicating "generally favorable reviews". Steve Greene of IndieWire, reviewing season one, praised the show's narrative empathy and "grace notes" between the show's more typical chapters. Luke Buckmaster of The Guardian was more guarded, stating the show "misses its marks"  and only hits its stride after the season's first episode. Upon the premiere of episodes "Gray Bird Grasshopper" and "Jungle Centipede", critic Alex Reif of laughingplace.com provided positive feedback, noting "...the strength of the series is that it tackles serious issues in a [..] comical way", and that the show is "a breath of fresh air".

Ratings

Season 1

Season 2

Accolades

References

External links

2020 American television series debuts
2021 American television series endings
2020s American LGBT-related comedy television series
Autism in television
Gay-related television shows
English-language television shows
Freeform (TV channel) original programming
Television shows set in Los Angeles
Television shows about the COVID-19 pandemic